The Soul-Mate (also known as Wonderful Ghost) is a 2018 South Korean comedy-drama film directed by Jo Won-hee. The film stars Ma Dong-seok, Kim Young-kwang and Lee Yoo-young. It was released on September 26, 2018.

Plot summary 
A judo instructor named Jang-su, thinks only about taking care of his daughter after losing his wife. But his life suddenly turns upside down when he becomes haunted by a soul named Tae-jin, an over-enthusiastic police officer who gets into a coma during a case investigation. Tae-jin, who can't stand injustice constantly convinces Jang-su to help him investigate his unsolved case where they embark on a dangerous journey.

Cast
Ma Dong-seok as Jang-su
Kim Young-kwang as Tae-jin
Lee Yoo-young as Hyeon-ji 
Choi Gwi-hwa as Jong-sik
Joo Jin-mo as Police inspector Yang
Choi Yoo-ri as Do-kyung, Jang-su's daughter
Bae Jung-hwa as Do-kyung's mother
Kim Ara as So-yeong
Yoon Hee-won as Section chief Lee (cameo)
Ye Jung-hwa as Beautiful woman passing by (cameo)
Ko Kyu-pil as Bong Goo

Production 
Principal photography began on August 10, 2016, and wrapped on October 10, 2016.

Release 
The film was released in South Korea on September 26, 2018, with age 12-rating.

Due to a competitive week from late September to early October (Chuseok holidays in South Korea), the film failed to secure more screens and was released on V.O.D on October 12, 2018, only 16 days after its theatrical release.

Reception 
On its opening day, the film finished fourth at the box office, attracting 163,647 moviegoers and grossing . During its opening weekend, the film finished in fourth place, grossing  from 172,082 attendance. The film dropped to eighth place during its second weekend, grossed  from 12,102 attendance, 95% lower gross compared to its debut weekend.

As of October 7, 2018, the film earned  gross from 450,106 total attendance.

References

External links

 The Soul-Mate at Naver

2018 films
2018 comedy-drama films
2010s ghost films
South Korean comedy-drama films
South Korean supernatural films
South Korean ghost films
2010s South Korean films